The 1991 Mobil Cotton Bowl Classic was a post-season college football game played on January 1, 1991. It pitted the #3 Texas Longhorns, champions of the Southwest Conference, against the independent #5 Miami Hurricanes.

Team backgrounds

Miami entered the game having only lost to BYU and Notre Dame.  Texas had stunned Penn State on the road 17-13 to open its season, then lost at home to Colorado 29-22 before winning nine straight games (including wins over then #4 Oklahoma and then #3 Houston to win the Southwest Conference championship.

Game summary

Miami led 19-3 at halftime, but put the game out of reach with two touchdowns within five minutes in the third quarter.  The Hurricanes also set Cotton Bowl and school records for most penalties (15) and most penalty yards (202) in a single game, many of which were for unsportsmanlike conduct.  Partly as a result of controversy from this game, the NCAA instituted a new rule stipulating that excessive celebration would be a 15-yard penalty.

Aftermath

The next season, Miami claimed the AP National Championship by going 12-0, ending with a 22-0 victory over Nebraska in the Orange Bowl.

Texas went 5-6 in their next season, did not play in another New Year's Day bowl game until 1995, and did not win another New Year's Day bowl game until the 1998 Cotton Bowl victory.

Scoring summary
First Quarter
8:53 UM - Carlos Huerta 28-yd field goal; Drive: 8 plays, 4 yards (3-0 UM)
5:26 UM - Huerta 50-yd field goal; Drive: 5 plays, 16 yards (6-0 UM)
0:11 UM - Wesley Carroll 12-yd pass from Craig Erickson (Erickson pass failed); Drive: 2 plays, 9 yards (12-0 UM)
Second Quarter
7:43 UT - Michael Pollak 29-yd field goal; Drive: 9 plays, 46 yards (12-3 UM)
4:17 UM - Carroll 24-yd pass from Erickson (Huerta kick); Drive: 2 plays, 21 yards (19-3 UM)
Third Quarter
11:46 UM - Darrin Smith 34-yd interception return (Huerta kick) (26-3 UM)
6:09 UM - Randal Hill 48-yd pass from Erickson (Huerta kick); Drive: 3 plays, 63 yards (33-3 UM)
Fourth Quarter
10:56 UM - Randy Bethel 4-yd pass from Erickson (Huerta kick blocked); Drive: 12 plays, 77 yards (39-3 UM)
9:23 UM - Leonard Conley 26-yd run (Huerta kick); Drive: 3 plays, 26 yards (46-3 UM)

References

Cotton Bowl Classic
Cotton Bowl Classic
Miami Hurricanes football bowl games
Texas Longhorns football bowl games
Cotton Bowl
January 1991 sports events in the United States
1990s in Dallas
1991 in Texas